Stephen Fretwell (born 10 November 1981) is an English singer-songwriter.

Biography
Fretwell attended St. Augustine Webster Primary School in Scunthorpe and St. Bede's Catholic School in Ashby before furthering his study at John Leggott College. It was in his teenage years that he started his first band, named Label.

After moving to Manchester to attend Salford University (to study English, but dropping out within a few days), he started to earn notices in NME and Q. During this period songs such as "Emily" and "What’s That You Say Little Girl?" were first written.

Fretwell decided to stay in Manchester permanently, later releasing 8 Songs which he released on Northern Ambition, a label owned by a friend. He left university after one year, and started to perform at local acoustic nights in the Manchester area. The first of these was at The Roadhouse, a venue in the centre of Manchester's Northern Quarter.

He later released the Something's Got to Give EP and The Lines, both self-financed. He then supported Travis, Elbow, Athlete, Keane and KT Tunstall. Signed to Fiction Records, and while under management by Colin Lester's and Ian McAndrew's Wildlife entertainment, his debut album Magpie was released in November 2004. It was recorded at the Abbey Road Studios. It peaked at No. 27 in the UK Albums Chart in August 2005. The first single taken from the album was "Run" and was subsequently followed by "Emily" (2005) and the Four Letter Words EP. "Emily" reached No. 42 in the UK Singles Chart in August 2005. He had previously supported Oasis at Marlay Park in Dublin on 16 July 2005.

He was described by Q as "Scunthorpe's finest export... ever". Fretwell described this as flattering but not something he actively encouraged.

His version of Jeff Buckley's "Morning Theft" appeared on the 2005 tribute album Dream Brother: The Songs of Tim and Jeff Buckley.

His song Play featured in the 2005 Dominic Savage film Love + Hate.

His song "Bad Bad You, Bad Bad Me" was featured in an episode of the ABC family drama Brothers & Sisters called "The Missionary Imposition".

He released a single called "Scar" on 3 September 2007, which was included on his album Man on the Roof. This album was recorded in New York City, released by Fiction Records on 10 September 2007, and featured James Iha. In the UK Albums Chart the album would peak at number 44, becoming his second Top 75 hit.

Fretwell also played bass on tour with the Last Shadow Puppets, the side project of Arctic Monkeys' Alex Turner.

His song "Run" is the theme tune to the situation comedy Gavin & Stacey and his song "Darling Don't" appeared on the third series of the teen drama Skins.

His song "Play" from the album Magpie was featured in the 2009 movie The Joneses.

On 1 March 2021, Fretwell released a new single, "Oval" after a 13 year hiatus and announced a new album, called Busy Guy, to be released on cult indie record label Speedy Wunderground.

Discography

Albums
8 Songs (Mini-album 2002)
Magpie (Fiction Records 2004) UK No. 27
Man on the Roof (Fiction Records 2007) UK No. 44
Busy Guy (Speedy Wunderground/PIAS 2021)

EPs
Something's Got to Give (EP)
The Lines
Four Letter Words (EP) (2007)

Singles
"Run" (2005) UK No. 79
"Emily" (2005) UK No. 42
"Scar" (2007)
"Oval" (2021)

Other contributions
Dream Brother: The Songs of Tim and Jeff Buckley (2006, Full Time Hobby) – "Morning Theft"

References

External links
Stephen Fretwell's official website
Official Profile on Instagram
Official Profile on Twitter
Interview on musicOMH.com

1981 births
Living people
English male singer-songwriters
People from Scunthorpe
Fiction Records artists
21st-century English singers
21st-century British male singers